The Thamesford Trojans are a Junior ice hockey team based in Thamesford, Ontario, Canada.  They play in the Provincial Junior Hockey League of the Ontario Hockey Association. They currently own the Exeter Hawks.

History

The Thamesford Trojans were founded in 1976 as members of the Western Ontario Junior D Hockey League.  In 1988, the league absorbed its competitor leagues and create a large "super league" that was renamed the OHA Junior Development League in 1991.

The Trojans from the 1989–90 until the 1991–92 season won three straight OHA Cups, the provincial championship.

In 1990, the Trojans fought all the way to the league finals.  In the finals they met the Lucan Irish.  After a hard-fought battle, the Trojans came out on top to win the series 4-games-to-2 and win their first ever OHA Cup.

The 1991 playoffs saw them reach the OHAJDL finals as well.  Their opponents again were the Lucan Irish.  The Trojans improved on the 1990 finals by defeating the Irish 4-games-to-1 to win their second straight OHA Cup.

The 1992 playoffs again saw the Trojans reach the championship series of the OHAJDL, which was once again against the Lucan Irish.  This time the Trojans completely dominated and swept the series 4-games-to-none to win a third straight OHA Cup.  The victory marked the first time since the award was first presented in 1948 that a team had won it three consecutive years.

In 1993, they made the OHAJDL finals once again, but ran into a team other than Lucan.  The Mitchell Hawks had won the other conference and were challenging for the OHA Cup for the first time since 1973.  The Hawks were not to be denied as they won the series 4-games-to-1 and broke the Trojan dynasty.

The Trojans finished the 1994–95 season in first place with 34 wins and only 2 losses on the entire season.  They pushed through to the OHAJDL finals and met the Port Stanley Lakers.  The Trojans defeated the Lakers 4-games-to-2 to clinch their fourth OHA Cup.

In 2003, the Trojans finished tenth overall in the OHAJDL.  In the playoffs, the Trojans baffled their competitors and made it all the way to the OHA Cup final.  Their opponent, another team that was unexpected, the eighth-seeded Wellesley Applejacks, were standing between the Trojans and a fifth OHA Cup.  The Trojans could not be stopped as they swept the Applejacks 4-games-to-none to win another league title.

After a strong winning season, the Trojans started out the 2006 playoffs against the Mount Brydges Bulldogs.  The Bulldogs fell to the Trojans 4-games-to-1.  In the second round of the playoffs, the Trojans drew the West Lorne Lakers, whom they swept 4-games-to-none.  In the conference final, the Trojans found themselves up against a Cinderella-story Lucan Irish.  The Irish upset the Trojans 4-games-to-1 to bounce them from the playoffs and went on to win the OHA Cup.

In 2006, the OHAJDL was disbanded and replaced with the Southern Ontario Junior Hockey League.  Again in 2007, the Trojans finished off the season with an excellent record.  In the first round of the playoffs, the Trojans drew the Lucan Irish and were able to exact revenge for the 2006 upset by defeating them 4-games-to-1.  In the second round, the Trojans were pitted against the North Middlesex Stars.  The Trojans beat the Stars 4-games-to-1 as well.  In the conference final, Thamesford ran into the eventual league champion for the second consecutive year as they fell to the Mitchell Hawks 4-games-to-2.

Season-by-season standings

Playoffs
1990 Won League
Thamesford Trojans defeated Lucan Irish 4-games-to-2 in final
1991 Won League
Thamesford Trojans defeated Lucan Irish 4-games-to-1 in final
1992 Won League
Thamesford Trojans defeated Lucan Irish 4-games-to-none in final
1993 Lost final
Mitchell Hawks defeated Thamesford Trojans 4-games-to-1 in final
1995 Won League
Thamesford Trojans defeated Port Stanley Lakers 4-games-to-2 in final
2003 Won League
Thamesford Trojans defeated Wellesley Applejacks 4-games-to-none in final
2006 Lost conference final
Thamesford Trojans defeated Mount Brydges Bulldogs 4-games-to-1 in conf. quarter-final
Thamesford Trojans defeated West Lorne Lakers 4-games-to-none in conf. semi-final
Lucan Irish defeated Thamesford Trojans 4-games-to-1 in conf. final
2007 Lost conference final
Thamesford Trojans defeated Lucan Irish 4-games-to-1 in conf. quarter-final
Thamesford Trojans defeated North Middlesex Stars 4-games-to-1 in conf. semi-final
Mitchell Hawks defeated Thamesford Trojans 4-games-to-2 in conf. final
2008 Won League
Thamesford Trojans defeated Lucan Irish 4-games-to-3 in conf. quarter-final
Thamesford Trojans defeated North Middlesex Stars 4-games-to-3 in conf. semi-final
Thamesford Trojans defeated Mount Brydges Bulldogs 4-games-to-0 in conf. final
Thamesford Trojans defeated Tavistock Braves 4-games-to-0 in final
2009 Lost round robin
Thamesford Trojans defeated Wellesley Applejacks 4-games-to-0 in conf. semi-final
Thamesford Trojans defeated Tavistock Braves 4-games-to-1 in conf. final
Thamesford Trojans defeated by North Middlesex Stars and Delhi Travellers in semi-final round robin
2010 Won League, won OHA Cup
Thamesford Trojans defeated Port Stanley Sailors 4-games-to-3 in conf. semi-final
Thamesford Trojans defeated Tavistock Braves 4-games-to-3 in conf. final
Thamesford Trojans and Exeter Hawks defeated Delhi Travellers in semi-final round robin
Thamesford Trojans defeated Exeter Hawks 4-games-to-3 in final
2011 Won league, won OHA Cup
Thamesford Trojans received first-round bye.
Thamesford Trojans defeated Lambeth Lancers 4-games-to-0 in conf. semifinal.
Thamesford Trojans defeated North Middlesex Stars 4-games-to-1 in conf. final.
Thamesford Trojans defeated Ayr Centennials 4-games-to-1 in OHA Cup final.
2012 Won league, won OHA Cup
Thamesford Trojans received first-round bye.
Thamesford Trojans defeated Mount Brydges Bulldogs 4-games-to-3 in conf. semifinal.
Thamesford Trojans defeated Lambeth Lancers 4-games-to-0 in conf. final.
Thamesford Trojans defeated Exeter Hawks 4-games-to-0 in OHA Cup final.
2013 Lost semifinals
Thamesford Trojans defeated Exeter Hawks 4-games-to-0 in quarter-finals.
Lambeth Lancers defeated Thamesford Trojans 4-games-to-0 in semifinals.
2014 Lost semifinals
Thamesford Trojans defeated Exeter Hawks "4-games-to-2 in quarter-finals
Dorchester Dolphins defeated Thamesford Trojans 4-games-to-0'' in semifinals

Notable alumni
Steve Rucchin

External links
Thamesford Trojans' Homepage

Southern Ontario Junior Hockey League teams